Bernard William Griffin (21 February 1899 – 19 August 1956) was an English cardinal of the Roman Catholic Church. He served as Archbishop of Westminster from 1943 until his death, and was elevated to the cardinalate in 1946 by Pope Pius XII.

Biography
Bernard and his twin brother Basil were born in Birmingham to William and Helen (née Swadkins) Griffin. His father was a bicycle manufacturer, Birmingham City councillor and justice of the peace.

When the First World War broke out in 1914 both Bernard and Basil joined the Royal Naval Air Service, with whom Bernard served as an air-raid warden. During this time he suffered a heart attack but concealed it from physicians in order to avoid a discharge which he feared would prevent his acceptance for the priesthood.

After the war Bernard went to Oscott College in Birmingham to train to be a priest. Ordained to the priesthood on 1 November 1924, he finished his studies at the Venerable English College in Rome in 1927. Griffin then worked as private secretary to John McIntyre, the Archbishop of Birmingham, until 1937. From 1929 to 1938, he served as diocesan chancellor of Birmingham, director of studies of the Catholic Evidence Guild, Catholic representative on the BBC's religious advisory committee, and administrator of diocesan charitable homes.

On 26 May 1938, Griffin was appointed Auxiliary Bishop of Birmingham and Titular Bishop of Appia. He received his episcopal consecration on 30 June from Thomas Williams (Archbishop of Birmingham), with John Barrett, Bishop of Plymouth, and William Lee (Bishop of Clifton), serving as co-consecrators, in the Cathedral of Saint Chad, Birmingham. Pius XII raised Griffin to Archbishop of Westminster, and thus ranking prelate in the Catholic Church in England and Wales, on 18 December 1943. At his installation Mass in Westminster Cathedral, he defended the sanctity of marriage.

Griffin was created Cardinal-Priest of San Gregorio Magno al Celio by Pius XII in the consistory of 18 February 1946. At age 46, he was the youngest cardinal to be appointed at the ceremony, to which he wore the tailored cappa magna of his deceased predecessor cardinal, Arthur Hinsley. He acted as papal legate to the centennial celebration of the restoration of the Catholic hierarchy in England in 1950.

As cardinal, Griffin took a keen interest in the rebuilding of post-war Britain arguing especially for the provision of Catholic schools. He was seen by some as liberal in areas of social principles. He also supported Sir William Beveridge.

Griffin upheld the doctrine of the perpetual virginity of Mary, and was once a president on the Council of Christians and Jews.

Griffin died from a heart attack in New Polzeath, at age 57, and was buried at Westminster Cathedral.

His coat of arms is blazoned Gules issuant from a barrulet enarched in base a sweet william plant in pale Or supported by a Saint Bernard dog dexter and a griffin wings addorsed sinister Or, thus representing his full name.

On the 22 October 1960, Bernard's twin brother, Basil, laid the foundation stone of Cardinal Griffin Catholic College in Cannock, Staffordshire.

Assessment

Adrian Hastings, an historian of English Catholicism, considered Griffin to be "the least important Archbishop of Westminster of the century, a nice, hard-working non-entity", and another English Catholic writer, Peter Stanford, in his book on Cardinal Hume, calls Griffin "an obscure but talented provincial auxiliary."

References

External links

Cardinals of the Holy Roman Church
Catholic-Hierarchy
 

1899 births
1956 deaths
People from Birmingham, West Midlands
Alumni of St Mary's College, Oscott
English College, Rome alumni
Roman Catholic archbishops of Westminster
20th-century British cardinals
Cardinals created by Pope Pius XII
Burials at Westminster Cathedral
British Roman Catholic archbishops